The 2013–14 season was Crystal Palace's first season back in the Premier League after eight years. After a poor start to the season which saw Ian Holloway resign and Tony Pulis take over as manager, Palace recovered and finished in 11th position. The club also competed in the League Cup and the FA Cup.

Background
In May 2013 the club unveiled a new badge for the coming season.  The club had previously announced designs to update the badge, but after none of the original designs met with fan approval the club utilised a design suggested by a fan and reworked it, launching it at the end of year awards on 7 May 2013. Palace also launched their new kit at the awards ceremony. The home kit is reminiscent of Barcelona, with red and blue halves on the shirt and yellow trim. Co-Chairman Steve Parish said the club would be looking to redevelop the ground at Selhurst Park. He said the club would be "working on re-developing the ground a stand at a time." In July Parish announced the main stand would be getting new seats. To celebrate promotion the club's cheerleaders, The Crystals, released a video of themselves and US cheerleaders the Jacksonville Jaguars ROAR performing "Glad All Over". The club also held their annual beer festival during the close season, and Kevin Day and Jo Brand hosted the second annual comedy night for Comic Relief and the Palace Academy.

The club bought their training ground in Beckenham for £2.3 million at auction after the current owners put the land up for sale.  The decision to purchase it was taken after a discussion between Co-chairman Steve Parish and the coaching staff at Palace. It was felt that the training ground's proximity to the club's natural catchment area was an asset too vital to lose. The club also announced that they would be looking for a sponsor for Selhurst Park.  Co-chairman Steve Parish told the Croydon Advertiser the club were looking to do a deal that was "not really (about) naming rights but a sponsor so that every advert in the stadium can be one thing."

Pre-season
Crystal Palace held talks with both Bordeaux and Inter Milan regarding a pre-season friendly to be held at Selhurst Park on 10 or 11 August. Bordeaux were unavailable, having a competitive match against Paris St Germain in the French league. Inter Milan were initially agreeable to the game, but after Real Madrid approached them with an offer of a friendly on the same date they decided to pursue that option rather than the Palace game. Palace then approached Italian Cup winners Lazio, and a date of 10 August was agreed for the final pre-season friendly. The club began their pre-season training in Portugal on 8 July 2013, Holloway described the trip as "very pleasing. Very nice surroundings, the lads have worked really hard".

The fixtures list saw Palace drawn against Premiership giants Tottenham at home for the first game of the season. Five matches involving Palace were initially chosen for broadcast, Sky opting to show the Palace vs Tottenham match on Sunday 18 August 2013, the home game against Sunderland on 31 August 2013 and the 21 October home game against Fulham.  BT Sport selected the away game against Manchester United on 14 September 2013 and the home game against Arsenal on 26 October.

Transfers

Crystal Palace announced the release of six players from their academy on 4 June 2013. Bayan Fenwick, Jack Holland, Kadell Daniel, Aaron Akuruka, William Johnson-Cole and Kieran Woodley all left the club having not been offered professional contracts following promotion to the Premier League. André Moritz also left the club by mutual agreement after a new deal could not be agreed.  Owen Garvan, Peter Ramage and Danny Gabbidon all signed new contracts while Stephen Dobbie's loan move from Brighton & Hove Albion was made permanent.  On 3 July 2013, Palace smashed their transfer record after signing Dwight Gayle from Peterborough United for a reported £4.5 million. Jerome Thomas signed a two-year contract with the club in early July. Alex Marrow left the club to return to Blackburn Rovers for an undisclosed fee. Marrow represented the club four times in the previous season.

Kit

|
|
|

Players

Squad information

|-
|colspan="12"|Players that left the club during the season.

Transfers and loans

Transfer in

Total spending:  £13,000,000  (~ £23,700,000)

Loan in

Transfer out

Total income:  Undisclosed

Loan out

Statistics

Player statistics

Numbers in parentheses denote appearances as substitute.
Players with no appearances not included in the list.

[L] - Out on loan
[O] - Left club permanent
* - One booked in League Cup
+ - One booked in FA Cup

Goalscorers

Disciplinary record

Goalkeeper statistics

Pre-season and friendlies

Last updated:18 July 2013Source:Crystal Palace F.C.

Competitions

Overall

Premier League

League table

Results summary

Results by matchday

Matches
Source:BBC Sport

FA Cup

League Cup

Overall summary

Summary

Score overview

Notes

References

Crystal Palace F.C. seasons
Crystal Palace